33 Vulpeculae is a single star located around 500 light-years away from the Sun in the northern constellation of Vulpecula. It is visible to the naked eye as a dim, orange-hued star with an apparent visual magnitude of 5.31. The object is drifting closer to the Earth with a heliocentric radial velocity of −25 km/s.

This is an evolved giant star with a stellar classification of K3.5 III, having exhausted the supply of hydrogen at it its core and expanded to 35 times the Sun's radius. It serves as a spectral standard for stars of its particular class. This star is radiating 334 times the luminosity of the Sun from its enlarged photosphere at an effective temperature of 4,070 K.

References

External links
 

K-type giants
Vulpecula
Durchmusterung objects
Vulpeculae, 33
199697
103511
8032